Arthur Augustus Allen (28 December 1885 – 17 January 1964) was an American professor of ornithology at Cornell University.

Allen was born in Buffalo, New York, the son of Daniel Williams Allen and Anna née Moore. He studied at Cornell University, where he obtained his Bachelor of Arts in 1907, his Master of Arts in 1908 and his Ph.D. in 1911. His thesis is entitled "The Red-Winged Blackbird: A Study in the Ecology of a Cattail Marsh".

From 1911 to 1912 he went on an expedition to Colombia, and from 1912 to 1916, he was appointed an instructor in zoology at Cornell. Former stockbroker Albert R. Brand was one of his graduate students. Brand collaborated with Cornell's engineering department to record bird songs, publishing two books accompanied by photographs.

He became an assistant professor in 1916, and a professor in 1926. Arthur continued his career at Cornell until his retirement in 1953. After his retirement, he was a public lecturer for the National Audubon Society from 1953 to 1959. It has been estimated that over 10,000 students took his courses, including over 100 doctoral students, at a time when Cornell was the only institution to offer advanced degrees in ornithology. Through his work, Allen introduced the field of ornithology to generations of professionals and amateurs.

In 1935 Allen led an expedition to the Singer Tract in Louisiana to search for ivory-billed woodpeckers. They did discover some, in what was to turn out to be the last documented, definite sighting, including photographs and audio. In the early 2000s there was a flurry of excitement at possible sightings in the same region, but controversy surrounds how sure the sightings were.

Allen published an ornithological history in 1933 under the title Fifty Years' Progress of American Ornithology, 1883–1933. He was dedicated to promoting the study of birds to a wide audience, in his books, films and public lectures. His Book of Bird Life (1930, reissued in 1961) was a well-written introduction to ornithology for its time. He also conducted pioneering studies on recording bird songs in 1929 which led to the first record on the phonograph of bird songs in 1932. He worked on what eventually became the independent Cornell Lab of Ornithology in 1955, and founded the Wildlife Society in 1936, leading the organization from 1938 to 1939.

Personal life
Allen married Elsa Guerdrum in 1913. They had five children. His wife also received a doctorate at Cornell and pursued a successful career as a historian of ornithology.

References

External links
 

1885 births
1964 deaths
American ornithologists
Scientists from Buffalo, New York
Scientists from Ithaca, New York
Cornell University alumni
Cornell University faculty
20th-century American zoologists